Dragan Stoisavljevic (born 25 November 2003) is a Serbian footballer who currently plays as a forward for Voždovac.

Career statistics

Club

Notes

References

2003 births
Living people
Serbian footballers
Serbia youth international footballers
Association football forwards
Serbian SuperLiga players
FK Voždovac players